Kulganino (Qolğana) is a rural locality (a village) and the administrative centre of Kulganinsky Selsoviet, Burzyansky District, Bashkortostan, Russia. The population was 288 as of 2010. There are 8 streets.

Geography 
Kulganino is located 71 km northeast of Starosubkhangulovo (the district's administrative centre) by road. Sargaya is the nearest rural locality.

References 

Rural localities in Burzyansky District